Zaktuy (Zagtad) is a rural locality (a selo) in Tunkinsky District, Republic of Buryatia, Russia. The population was 191 as of 2010. There are 4 streets.

Geography 
Zaktuy is located 36 km east of Kyren (the district's administrative centre) by road. Tunka is the nearest rural locality.

References 

Rural localities in Tunkinsky District